Bill Owen is an American politician. He is a Republican member of the 131st district of the Missouri House of Representatives.

Born in Springfield, Missouri. Owen attended Parkview High School. After high school, he attended at Drury University, where he earned his undergraduate degree, and then attended the University of Wisconsin, where he earned his postgraduate education degree. He worked as a banker. In 2021, Owen won the election for the 131st district of the Missouri House of Representatives, succeeding Sonya Anderson. Owen assumed his office on January 6, 2021. Owen decided to run for re-election in 2022.

Electoral History

State Representative

References 

Living people
Year of birth missing (living people)
Politicians from Springfield, Missouri
Republican Party members of the Missouri House of Representatives
21st-century American politicians
American bankers
Drury University alumni
University of Wisconsin–Madison alumni